Cenk Tekelioğlu (born 4 August 1973) is a retired Turkish professional footballer who played as a goalkeeper.

Tekelioğlu previously played for Sarıyer G.K., Konyaspor, Diyarbakirspor, Bursaspor, Altay S.K., Eskişehirspor, Sakaryaspor, and Bucaspor.

References

1973 births
Living people
Footballers from Istanbul
Sarıyer S.K. footballers
Konyaspor footballers
Diyarbakırspor footballers
Bursaspor footballers
Altay S.K. footballers
Eskişehirspor footballers
Sakaryaspor footballers
Bucaspor footballers

Association football goalkeepers